Alticeps is a genus of planthoppers belonging to the family Achilidae.

Species
Species:
 Alticeps vigilis Williams, 1977

References

Achilidae